Komai (written: 駒井) is a Japanese surname. Notable people with the surname include:

, Japanese-American actor
, Japanese footballer

Japanese-language surnames